Pimenta's point is an anatomical landmark for easy location of the posterior tibial artery or tibialis posterior artery (a peripheral pulse on the inside of your ankle). An imagined line is drawn between the bony prominence of the medial malleolus and the insertion of the achilles tendon. At the exact midpoint of this line place three fingers parallel to the leg and you will either feel the posterior tibial pulsation (normal) or will not (peripheral vascular disease or calcification, anatomical variant).

See also 
 List of human anatomical parts named after people

References

 Oxford Handbook for Medical School. Kapil Sugand, Miriam Berry, Imran Yusuf, Aisha Janjua, Chris Bird, David Metcalfe, Harveer Dev, Sri Thrumurthy. Oxford University Press. 2019.
 Emergency Orthopedics Handbook. Daniel Purcell, Sneha A. Chinai, Brandon R. Allen, Moira Davenport. 2019.
 Vascular Surgery: Principles and Practice, Fourth Edition. by Samuel Eric Wilson, Juan Carlos Jimenez, Frank J. Veith, A. Ross Naylor, John A. C. Buckels. CRC Press. 2017.

Arteries of the lower limb
Diseases of arteries, arterioles and capillaries
Anatomic Landmarks